Assile Toufaily (born 16 August 1996) is a Lebanese former footballer who played as a midfielder. She also played futsal.

Club career 
Toufaily became interested in football aged six, in 2002, after attending a game between Ansar and Nejmeh in Beirut with her father and younger brother. In November 2009, she took part in the "Football Festival" organised in Jordan by the Norwegian Football Federation. Toufaily signed her first contract a few months later in 2010, and played two seasons at Shabab Arabi's youth system.

She spent the following years with three other clubs (GFA, SAS and Safa). After having won two Lebanese Women's Football League titles with SAS in 2016–17 and 2018–19, Toufaily signed for Safa in 2019. During the 2020–21 season, she sustained an ACL injury, which forced her to retire in 2021.

International career 
Toufaily played for the Lebanon national team.

Personal life 
After her retirement as a player in 2021, Toufaily moved to Lyon, France, to study sociology of sport at Claude Bernard University Lyon 1.

Honours 
SAS
 Lebanese Women's Football League: 2016–17, 2018–19
 Lebanese Women's FA Cup: 2018–19; runner-up: 2016–17, 2017–18
 Lebanese Women's Super Cup: 2016–17; runner-up: 2017–18, 2018–19

Safa
 Lebanese Women's Football League: 2020–21

See also
 List of Lebanon women's international footballers

References

External links
 
 

1996 births
Living people
People from Nabatieh
Lebanese women's footballers
Lebanese women's futsal players
Women's association football midfielders
Al Shabab Al Arabi Club Beirut (women) players
Girls Football Academy players
Stars Association for Sports players
Safa WFC players
Lebanese Women's Football League players
Lebanon women's international footballers
University of Lyon alumni